State Road 136 (SR 136), locally known as Thunder Road, is a  east–west route in Suwannee, Columbia and Hamilton Counties. Its western terminus is just west of Interstate 75 and is a continuation of County Road 136 in rural Suwannee County. Its eastern terminus is US 41 in White Springs.

Route description

For the most part, SR 136 serves as an access road from Interstate 75 to White Springs. The road then enters Columbia County, travelling about  before crossing the Suwannee River into Hamilton County. Upon entering Haminton County (and the city of White Springs), the road is renamed Bridge Street. The State Road designation terminates at US 41 (SR 25), but Bridge Street continues north as a local road.

Related routes

County Road 136

County Road 136 runs from CR 252 in Dowling Park to State Road 51 in Live Oak, and is overlapped by SR 51 through the multiplex with US 129 briefly. It then continues west until it reaches the western terminus of SR 136 west of I-75. CR 136 is a cross-county and mostly rural road, crossing only through the city of Live Oak on its journey.

County Road 136A

County Road 136A is suffixed alternate of County Road 136 that runs from US 129 in Rixford to CR 136 west of Pouchers Corner.

Major intersections

References

136
136
136
136
136